Complete results for Women's Super Combined competition at the 2011 World Championships. It ran on February 11 at 10:00 local time (downhill) and 14:00 local time (slalom), the third race of the championships. 40 athletes from 18 countries competed.

Results

References

Super combined, women's
2011 in German women's sport
FIS